is a compilation album by Japanese singer/songwriter Chisato Moritaka, released on August 8, 2012 to commemorate the 25th anniversary of her music career, as well as her return to the music industry after her retirement in 1999. The three-disc album compiles all of Moritaka's singles from 1987 to 1999. A special edition release includes a 48-page photo booklet.

The album peaked at No. 5 on Oricon and Billboard Japan's albums charts.

To commemorate Moritaka's 35th anniversary, Warner Music Japan released The Singles on global streaming media platforms on June 25, 2022. The release is split in two digital albums: The Singles 1987–1992 (which covers songs from "New Season" to "Watashi ga Obasan ni Natte mo") and The Singles 1993–1999 (which covers songs from "Watarasebashi" to "Ichido Asobi ni Kite yo '99").

Track listing 
All lyrics are written by Chisato Moritaka, except where indicated; all music is composed and arranged by Hideo Saitō, except where indicated.

Charts

References

External links 
  (Chisato Moritaka)
  (Warner Music Japan)
 
 

2012 compilation albums
Chisato Moritaka compilation albums
Japanese-language compilation albums
Warner Music Japan compilation albums